BKK Partners is an Australian boutique investment bank that provides corporate advisory services including mergers and acquisitions, capital markets and strategic consulting. The firm was founded in 2009 by former Goldman Sachs JBWere bankers Alastair Walton, Andrew Stuart and John Anderson. BKK Partners currently has six managing directors including the former Treasurer of Australia, the Hon Peter Costello.

Transactions include:
 Aston Resources - Acquisition of Maules Creek coking and thermal coal project (February 2010)
 The GPT Group - Unwinding of structured interest rate swap portfolio (November 2009)
 National Australia Bank - Acquisition of JB Were Private Wealth Management (July 2009)

See also
 Corporate advisory
 Investment bank

References

External links
 Official Website

Investment banks
Financial services companies of Australia